Westville is an unincorporated community in Chariton County, in the U.S. state of Missouri.

History
Westville was platted in 1857, and named after Dr. W. S. West, a first settler. A post office called Westville was established in 1857, and remained in operation until 1909.

References

Unincorporated communities in Chariton County, Missouri
1857 establishments in Missouri
Unincorporated communities in Missouri